Chamelea is a genus of small saltwater clams, marine bivalve molluscs in the family Veneridae, the venus clams.

Species 
Species within the genus Chamelea include:
 Chamelea gallina 
 Chamelea striatula

Veneridae
Bivalve genera